Gordon Tanner (July 17, 1918–August 3, 1983) was a Canadian actor.

Filmography

References

External links

1918 births
1983 deaths
Male actors from Toronto
Canadian male film actors
20th-century Canadian male actors